Augusto Heleno Ribeiro Pereira (born 29 October 1947) is a Brazilian politician retired General of the Brazilian Army. He was military commander of the Amazon and Chief of the Department of Science and Technology of the Army. Heleno has declared positions against official politics, particularly about the attitude of the international community in regards to Haiti and the indigenous politics of the Brazilian government.

During Jair Bolsonaro presidential campaign, the candidate invited Heleno as his running mate in the election, but his party refused. The general was then invited for Minister of Defence of Bolsonaro's government. However, the nominated minister stepped back and was chosen for the Institutional Security Cabinet.

Military career
Heleno graduated as Aspirant of cavalry in 1969, at the Military Academy of Agulhas Negras, placing first in his cavalry class. He was also the first in the cavalry class in the Officials Improvement School (EsAO) and Army Command and Staff School (ECEME), receiving the silver Marshal Hermes medal with three crowns. As Major, Heleno joined the Brazilian mission of instruction in Paraguay. As Colonel, he commanded the Preparatory School for Army Cadets (EsPCEx) in Campinas and was military attaché in the Brazilian Embassy in Paris, also accredited in Brussels.

From June 2004 to September 2005, he was the first military commander of the United Nations Stabilisation Mission in Haiti (MINUSTAH), made up of 6,250 Blue Helmets from 13 countries, of which 7 were Latin Americans. During his time in Haiti he was known for leading a United Nations armed assault on Cité Soleil that killed dozens of people including Dread Wilme. Similarly to Chilean ambassador Juan Gabriel Valdés, special representative of the Secretary-General of the United Nations and chief of the mission, and of the Latin American governments, General Heleno expressed his disapproval at the strategy adopted by the international community about Haiti. He was succeeded in the MINUSTAH command by General Urano Teixeira da Mata Bacelar, who committed suicide in Port-au-Prince, four months later, in January 2006.

As military commander of the Amazon, General Heleno contested the indigenous politics of the government of president Luiz Inácio Lula da Silva, who characterized the policies as "unfortunate, if not chaotic" during a speech in the Military Club in Rio de Janeiro, at the time of the demarcation of the indigenous land of Raposa/Serra do Sol. He stated that the indigenous "gravitate around our squads because they are completely abandoned".

His last occupation in the active service was as chief of the Department of Science and Technology. On 9 May 2011, in a ceremony in the Army Headquarters in Brasília, Heleno retired and defended the 1964 military regime, after 45 years of military life.

Life after retirement
General Heleno acted as security and military issues consultant of the Grupo Bandeirantes, where he collaborated being a commentator in the broadcasters' schedule.

Heleno was also Communication and Corporative Education director of the Brazilian Olympic Committee (COB).

In 2013, he was convicted of authorizing illegal grants.

On 18 July 2018, there was a rumor that General Heleno would be nominated as candidate for vice presidency of Brazil, along with Deputy Jair Bolsonaro's coalition. However, he denied the candidacy for not being of his party interest, but kept supporting Bolsonaro's candidacy for President of Brazil and was subsequently invited for the Ministry of Defence. However, ten days later it was confirmed that Bolsonaro had chosen him to run the Institutional Security Office of the Presidency of the Republic.

He is the son of Ari de Oliveira Pereira and Edina Ribeiro Pereira, is married to Sônia Pereira and had two children: Renata and Mário Márcio.

On 18 March 2020, Heleno tested positive for COVID-19.

References

|-

|-

|-

1947 births
Living people
Brazilian generals
United Nations military personnel
Politicians from Curitiba
Brazilian politicians convicted of corruption
Government ministers of Brazil